The IBA Youth World Boxing Championships and the IBA Junior World Boxing Championships are amateur boxing competitions organised by the International Boxing Association (IBA), the sport's governing body, for "Youth" competitors—ages 17 or 18 years old (U19), and for "Junior" competitors—ages 15 or 16 years old (U17), respectively. The Youth world championship began in 1979 in Yokohama, Japan, and has been held biennially since 1990. The Junior world championship began in 2001 in Baku, Azerbaijan, and has been held biennially since 2007.

History   
The competitions are under the supervision of the world's governing body for amateur boxing AIBA and are the younger versions of the World Amateur Boxing Championships. Starting from 2008, the Junior world championships, which ran from 1979 to 2006, was renamed the Youth World Boxing Championships. Starting from 2009, the Cadet world championships, which ran from 2001 to 2007, was renamed the Junior World Boxing Championships.

Youth (Junior) Championships (U19)
IBA Youth World Boxing Championships

Men
 17–18 years in 10 weight classes
 http://amateur-boxing.strefa.pl/Championships/WorldJuniorChamps.html
 http://www.aiba.org/aiba-youth-world-boxing-championships/

Women
 Youth: 17–18 years in 10 weight classes
 http://amateur-boxing.strefa.pl/Championships/World_wom_Champs_J.html
 http://www.aiba.org/aiba-womens-youthjunior-world-boxing-championships/

Combined (Men and Women)

Junior (Cadet) Championships (U17)

Men
 15–16 years in 13 weight classes
 http://amateur-boxing.strefa.pl/Championships/WorldCadetChampionships.html
 http://www.aiba.org/aiba-junior-world-boxing-championships/

Women
 Junior: 15–16 years in 13 weight classes
 http://amateur-boxing.strefa.pl/Championships/World_wom_Champs_J.html
 http://www.aiba.org/aiba-womens-youthjunior-world-boxing-championships/

See also
 European Amateur Boxing Championships
 World Amateur Boxing Championships
 Boxing World Cup

Results
http://amateur-boxing.strefa.pl/Championships/AAAChampionships.html
http://www.aiba.org/

References

Youth
Recurring sporting events established in 2008
Boxing
AIBA, youth